Small subunit ribosomal ribonucleic acid (SSU rRNA) is the smaller of the two major RNA components of the ribosome.
Associated with a number of ribosomal proteins, the SSU rRNA forms the small subunit of the ribosome. It is encoded by SSU-rDNA.

Characteristics

Use in phylogenetics
SSU rRNA sequences are widely used for determining evolutionary relationships among organisms, since they are of ancient origin and are found in all known forms of life.

See also 
LSU rRNA: the large subunit ribosomal ribonucleic acid.

References 

Ribosomal RNA
Protein biosynthesis